Isaac "Argy" Ward (born 7 April 1977) is an English amateur featherweight and professional super bantamweight boxer.

Ward was born in Darlington. As an amateur, he was runner-up for the 2000 Amateur Boxing Association of England (ABAE) featherweight title, against David Mullholland (Salisbury ABC), boxing out of Darlington ABC, and as a professional won the Commonwealth super bantamweight title.  He was a challenger for the British Boxing Board of Control (BBBofC) British bantamweight title, against Martin Power.

References

External links

1977 births
English male boxers
Featherweight boxers
Living people
Sportspeople from Darlington
Super-bantamweight boxers